Villaviciosa de Córdoba is a municipality of Spain located in the province of Córdoba, in the autonomous community of Andalusia.

The municipality spans across a total area of 468.75 km2.

References

Municipalities in the Province of Córdoba (Spain)